Departure is the third studio album by American singer Jesse McCartney. It was released on May 20, 2008 through Hollywood Records. The album was re-released on April 7, 2009, under the name Departure: Recharged. The album featured a heavier R&B sound, and spawned three US Hot 100 top 40 hits, "Leavin'", "How Do You Sleep?", and "Body Language". The latter two were released as singles from the recharged edition.

Album information
It has been described by McCartney as a complete change in musical style compared to his previous releases . About the new album, he said, "I'm shooting for Prince chord changes, Michael [Jackson] melodies, and the bigness of Madonna - fun '80s stuff. That's the best that I can put it". Producers on the album include Tricky Stewart, The-Dream, Sean Garrett, The Clutch, Brian Kennedy, and J. R. Rotem.

The album leaked April 30, 2008, almost three weeks before the release date. Departure was released one week early on the Canadian iTunes Store. The CD was released using CDVU+ technology. Some countries, including the UK and Brazil, were excluded from the recycled packaging and CDVU+ Software on the release.

Departure was re-released under the name Departure: Recharged on April 7, 2009. It includes five brand-new tracks and the remix of "How Do You Sleep?" featuring Ludacris. McCartney said that the five new tracks, including three brand-new compositions, would be available for individual sale online for those who already own Departure. McCartney said the following about the re-release: "I kind of want to rejuvenate the album a little bit and make it fresh again for everyone and make sure if they haven't checked it out yet that they will this time".

The songs, "Leavin", "It's Over", and "How Do You Sleep" were frequently played on Radio Disney. "Leavin" was featured on the Radio Disney Jams 11 CD, while "How Do You Sleep" was featured in the Disney live action film, G-Force.

'Departure' debuted at No. 14 on the Billboard 200 in May with sales of 30,200 copies and stayed on the charts for 24 weeks. The album also peaked at No.9 in the Digital Albums chart. The album has sold 272,000 copies to date.

Singles

"Leavin'" – The song was the first single from the album and debuted at number 14 on the Billboard Hot 100 with a final rank at 10, number two on the Pop 100, and number one on the Pop 100 Airplay and the Mainstream Top 40 charts. The music video of the song was directed by Sanji. "Leavin'" also managed to reach number one on the American Top 40.
"It's Over" – The second single was released in August. The video was released only in November. The song did not reach the success of "Leavin'", peaking at number sixty-two on the Hot 100 and number thirty-one on the Pop 100. "It's Over" managed to gain wider popularity outside the United States mostly in Asian countries like Malaysia and Singapore by peaking at number one at local radio station charts like Fly FM.
"How Do You Sleep?" – Is the third single released from Departure. A single version, featuring rapper Ludacris, was made and sent to radio and has peaked at number twenty-six on the Hot 100 and at number seven on the Media Base's Top 40 Songs.
"Body Language" - is the second single from Departure: Recharged. The album version is a solo version, while the single version is a duet with R&B singer T-Pain. The single peaked at 35 on the Billboard Hot 100.

Critical reception

The album received mixed reviews from music critics. Johnny Dee from Virgin Media reviewed the album saying "Without doubt the pop album of the summer." He praised McCartney's musical growth and transition stating, "McCartney has undergone an incredible re-invention from soppy tween pin-up into an R&B love stallion", comparing the new McCartney style with Justin Timberlake with the same permutation of sexual bragging and toned pop arrangements that has served him so well. He also stated about the album, "the urban slang doesn't sound very convincing but the melodies and excellent production are so sharp he gets away with it", giving it 4.5 stars out of 5.

AllMusic described the album as "a successful attempt from McCartney but still not fully complete to prove that he's no longer a kid, breaking out of his Disney Past also a departure from the stuffy adult contemporary vibe of 2006's Right Where You Want Me, which found the then-teenager acting far older than his years"; and gave it 3.5 stars out of 5. Alex Macpherson from The Guardian reviewed (Departure) as a two step process: "First, put pen to paper and come up with Bleeding Love, the monster single that launched Leona Lewis on the world. Second, reinvent yourself as an Usher-in-waiting on your third album with the help of the best post-Timbaland R&B producers (Tricky Stewart and The-Dream, the Clutch)"; and gave it four stars out of five.

Nick Levine from Digital Spy described the album as "pointing to a brighter future' for the "fresh-faced" McCartney, and gave credit to him as he stated: "McCartney's contribution shouldn't be underestimated. He's a sexier, more convincing vocalist than people would think." Also, giving credit to the production team, which includes JR Rotem, Sean Garrett and Tricky and The Dream, and as if comparing between McCartney and Justin Timberlake he stated, "JT needn't get scared yet, but he should be aware that a new pretender to his throne has arrived". Levine gave the album 4 out of 5 stars, complimenting the change in McCartney's musical style and Departure for having "plenty of winning moments".

Promotion
A tour to promote the album began on August 5, 2008, and ended on August 30, 2008. Another tour to promote the album began on February 13, 2009.

McCartney was performing as the opening act for New Kids on the Block in the summer of 2009.

Track listing

Standard edition

Departure: Recharged

Charts

Release history

References

External links
 Departure on Myspace

2008 albums
Albums produced by Brian Kennedy (record producer)
Albums produced by Eric Hudson
Albums produced by J. R. Rotem
Albums produced by Sean Garrett
Albums produced by The-Dream
Albums produced by Tricky Stewart
Hollywood Records albums
Jesse McCartney albums
Albums produced by Kuk Harrell